Mahmud is a transliteration of the male Arabic given name , common in most parts of the Islamic world. It comes from the Arabic triconsonantal root Ḥ-M-D, meaning praise, along with Muhammad.

Siam Mahmud
Mahmood (singer) (born 1992), full name Alessandro Mahmoud, Italian singer of Italian and Egyptian origin
Mahmoud (horse) (foaled 1933), French-bred, British-trained Thoroughbred racehorse and sire
Mehmood (actor), Indian actor, singer, director and producer

Given name

Mahmood
Mahmood Ali (1928–2008), Pakistani radio, television and stage artist
Mahmood Hussain (cricketer) (1932–1991), Pakistani Test cricketer
Mahmood Hussain (councillor), former Lord Mayor of Birmingham, England
Mahmood Mamdani (born 1946), Ugandan academic, author and political commentator
Mahmood Monshipouri (born 1952), Iranian-born American scholar, educator, and author
Mahmood Shaam (born 1940), Pakistani Urdu language journalist, poet writer and analyst
Mahmood (singer) (born 1992), Italian singer-songwriter and participant in Eurovision Song Contest 2019 and Eurovision Song Contest 2022

Mahmoud

Mahmoud Abbas, President of the State of Palestine
Mahmoud al-Abrash (born 1944), Syrian politician
Mahmoud Afshartous (1907–1953), Iranian military officer
Mahmoud Ahmadinejad, former President of Iran
Mahmoud Ahmed, Ethiopian musician
Mahmoud Baharmast, Iranian army general
Mahmoud Balbaa, Egyptian businessman and politician
Mahmoud Chahoud (born 1976), Lebanese footballer
Mahmoud Darwish, Palestinian poet
Mahmoud Fakhry Pasha (1884–1955), Egyptian politician and diplomat
Mahmoud Fustuq (died 2006), Lebanese businessman 
Mahmoud Guinia, Moroccan singer
Mahmoud Hussein, Egyptian journalist
Mahmoud Hweimel (died 2013), Jordanian politician
Mahmoud Jaballah, Egyptian-Canadian Jihad member
Mahmoud el-Meliguy, Egyptian Actor
Mahmoud an-Nukrashi Pasha, Prime Minister of Egypt 1945–1946 and 1946–1948
Mahmoud Salem (1931–2013), Egyptian journalist and author
Mahmoud Abdel Salam Omar, Egyptian businessman
Mahmoud Abdul Razak, Syrian footballer
Mahmoud Abdul-Rauf, American basketball player
Mahmoud el-Sisi (born 1982), Egyptian brigadier general and son of President Abdel-Fattah el-Sisi
Mahmoud Zakzouk (1933–2020), Egyptian academic 
Mahmoud Abu Zeid, also known as Shawkan, (born c. 1987), Egyptian photojournalist
Mahmoud Taleghani, Iranian Shia Cleric
Mahmoud Alavi, Iranian Shia Cleric
Mahmoud Hashemi Shahroudi, Iranian Shia Cleric
Mahmoud Mar'ashi Najafi, Iranian Shia Cleric
, Iranian Shia Cleric
Mahmoud Nabavian, Iranian Shia Cleric
Mahmoud Salavati, Iranian Shia Cleric

Mahmud
Mahmud al-Kashgari, Uyghur scholar
Mahmud Al-Nashaf, Israeli Arab politician
Mahmud Hotaki, Afghan ruler
Mahmud I, Sultan of Ottoman Empire 1730–1754
Mahmud II, Sultan of Ottoman Empire 1808–1839
Mahmud II of Great Seljuk, Sultan of Baghdad in 1118
Mahmud Khalid, Ghanaian politician 
Mahmud Mahmud, Iranian politician
Mahmud of Ghazni, ruler of Ghazni 997–1030
Mahmud Shah (Sultan of Malacca), Sultan of Malacca 1488–1528
Mahmud Shah Durrani, ruler of Afghanistan 1801–1803 & 1809–1818
Mahmud Tarzi, Afghan journalist
Mahmud Arif, Saudi Arabian poet
 Mahmud Deobandi
 Mahmud Hasan Deobandi
 Mahmud Hasan Gangohi
 Mufti Mahmud
 Mahmud Khan of Bengal, 17th-century Bengali nobleman

Mahmut
Mahmut Bezgin, Turkish footballer
Mahmut Boz, Turkish footballer
Mahmut Bozteke (born 1997), Turkish para taekwondo practitioner
Mahmut Celal Bayar, third President of Turkey
Mahmut Cuhruk, Turkish judge
Mahmut Demir, Turkish sport wrestler
Mahmut Hoşgiz, Turkish footballer 
Mahmut Özdemir (born 1987), German politician of Turkish descent
Mahmut Özgener, Turkish Football Federation president
Mahmut Şenol, Turkish author
Mahmut Tekdemir, Turkish footballer
Mahmut Yavuz, Turkish navy officer and ultramarathon runner
Mahmut Yıldırım, Kurdish contract killer
Mahmut Yilmaz, German footballer of Turkish descent

Mehmood
Mehmood Ali, Indian film actor in Bollywood, credited as Mehmood
Mehmood Aslam, Pakistani Television & Stage Actor 
Mehmood Bhatti, Pakistani fashion designer
Mehmood Quaraishy, Kenyan cricketer
Mehmood Sham, Pakistani journalist

Mehmud
Maulana Mehmud Hasan, Indian independence activist
Mehmud Khurd, Pakistani ruler

Surname

Mahmood
Abdullah al Mahmood, Bengali politician, lawyer and former minister in Pakistan
Iqbal Hasan Mahmud, Bangladeshi politician and minister
Kashif Mahmood (cricketer, born 1985), Pakistani cricketer
Saba Mahmood, American anthropologist
Sajid Mahmood, English cricketer
Sultan Bashiruddin Mahmood, Pakistani nuclear engineer
Shabana Mahmood, British politician
Shahid Mahmood, Pakistani cricketer
Syed Mahmood, Indian jurist
Tahir Mahmood, Indian jurist
Talat Mahmood, Indian singer and actor
Zia Mahmood, Pakistani bridge player

Mahmoud
Ahmad Mahmoud, Iranian novelist
Alessandro Mahmoud, better known as Mahmood, Italian singer
Emtithal Mahmoud, Sudanese poet and activist
Karem Mahmoud, Egyptian singer
Shaaban Mahmoud, Egyptian footballer
Younis Mahmoud, Iraqi footballer

Mahmud
Abid Hamid Mahmud, Iraqi general
A. T. Mahmud, Indonesian songwriter
Firoz Mahmud, Bangladeshi Contemporary Artist
Hayat Mahmud, Bengali feudal lord and military commander
Heyat Mahmud, medieval Bengali poet
Khaled Mahmud, Bangladeshi cricketer
Mahmud Mahmud, Iranian academic and politician

Mehmood
Arif Mehmood, Pakistani footballer
Arshad Mehmood (composer), Pakistani actor and music composer
Arshad Mehmood (singer), Pakistani singer
Faakhir Mehmood, Pakistani singer 
Hasnat Mehmood, Pakistani artist
Kashif Mehmood, Pakistani actor

Mehmud
Salim Mehmud, Pakistani rocket scientist

Arabic-language surnames
Arabic masculine given names
Turkish masculine given names
Bosniak masculine given names